Muslim Girl Magazine was a bi-monthly fashion, beauty, and lifestyle publication marketed for young Muslim women. The magazine was first published in January 2007. It was published by Toronto's ExecuGo Media, and offered style advice, articles on movies and music and general advice, but with a grounding in Islamic issues and with features on Muslim personalities, countries, and cultures. The headquarters was in Toronto, though the magazine's reach was international during its two years of publishing.

The magazine's contributors included writers and journalists Mona Eltahawy, Melody Moezzi, Naheed Mustafa, and many more. Ausma Khan was the editor in chief.

See also
Women in Islam

References

External links
 

2007 establishments in California
Bimonthly magazines published in the United States
Religious magazines published in the United States
Defunct women's magazines published in the United States
Islamic magazines
Magazines established in 2007
Magazines with year of disestablishment missing
Magazines published in Los Angeles
Religious works for children
Teen magazines